The 2023 Union Omaha season will be the fourth season in the soccer team's history, and their fourth season in the third division of American soccer, USL League One. This will be the team's first season without head coach Jay Mims, after the club announced his resignation on December 16. He was replaced by Dominic Casciato, who was most recently an assistant coach at El Paso Locomotive of the USL Championship. Union Omaha will play their home games at Werner Park, located in Papillion, Nebraska, United States.

Transfers

Transfers in

Loan In

Transfers out

Roster
Union Omaha announced their initial list of returning players on December 7, 2022.

Competitions

Exhibitions

USL League One

Standings

Results summary

Results by round

Match results

U.S.Open Cup

Statistics

Appearances and goals

Numbers after plus–sign (+) denote appearances as a substitute.

Disciplinary record
{| class="wikitable" style="text-align:center;"
|-
| rowspan="2" !width=15|
| rowspan="2" !width=15|
| rowspan="2" !width=120|Player
| colspan="3"|USL1
| colspan="3"|US Open Cup
| colspan="3"|Total
|-
!width=34; background:#fe9;|
!width=34; background:#fe9;|
!width=34; background:#ff8888;|
!width=34; background:#fe9;|
!width=34; background:#fe9;|
!width=34; background:#ff8888;|
!width=34; background:#fe9;|
!width=34; background:#fe9;|
!width=34; background:#ff8888;|
|-
|| 3 || DF ||align=left|   Stefan Mueller
|| 0 || 0 || 0 || 0 || 0 || 0 || 0 || 0 || 0
|-
|| 4 || DF ||align=left|   Luca Mastrantonio
|| 0 || 0 || 0 || 0 || 0 || 0 || 0 || 0 || 0
|-
|| 5 || DF ||align=left|   Marco Milanese
|| 0 || 0 || 0 || 0 || 0 || 0 || 0 || 0 || 0
|-
|| 6 || MF ||align=left|   Chavany Willis
|| 0 || 0 || 0 || 0 || 0 || 0 || 0 || 0 || 0
|-
|| 7 || FW ||align=left|  Noe Meza
|| 0 || 0 || 0 || 0 || 0 || 0 || 0 || 0 || 0
|-
|| 8 || MF ||align=left|  Joe Brito
|| 0 || 0 || 0 || 0 || 0 || 0 || 0 || 0 || 0
|-
|| 9 || MF ||align=left|  Pedro Dolabella
|| 0 || 0 || 0 || 0 || 0 || 0 || 0 || 0 || 0
|-
|| 10 || FW ||align=left|   Steevan Dos Santos
|| 0 || 0 || 0 || 0 || 0 || 0 || 0 || 0 || 0
|-
|| 11 || MF ||align=left|   Joe Gallardo
|| 0 || 0 || 0 || 0 || 0 || 0 || 0 || 0 || 0
|-
|| 12 || MF ||align=left|  Eddie Gordon
|| 0 || 0 || 0 || 0 || 0 || 0 || 0 || 0 || 0
|-
|| 14 || DF ||align=left|   Sebastian Sanchez
|| 0 || 0 || 0 || 0 || 0 || 0 || 0 || 0 || 0
|-
|| 17 || MF ||align=left|  JP Scearce
|| 0 || 0 || 0 || 0 || 0 || 0 || 0 || 0 || 0
|-
|| 18 || DF ||align=left|   Junior Palacios
|| 0 || 0 || 0 || 0 || 0 || 0 || 0 || 0 || 0
|-
|| 20 || MF ||align=left|  Luis Gil
|| 0 || 0 || 0 || 0 || 0 || 0 || 0 || 0 || 0
|-
|| 22 || MF ||align=left|   Conor Doyle
|| 0 || 0 || 0 || 0 || 0 || 0 || 0 || 0 || 0
|-
|| 24 || GK ||align=left|  Rashid Nuhu
|| 0 || 0 || 0 || 0 || 0 || 0 || 0 || 0 || 0
|-
|| 25 || GK ||align=left|  Ian McGrane
|| 0 || 0 || 0 || 0 || 0 || 0 || 0 || 0 || 0
|-
|| 26 || MF ||align=left|  Dion Acoff
|| 0 || 0 || 0 || 0 || 0 || 0 || 0 || 0 || 0
|-
|| 28 || DF ||align=left|  Shaft Brewer Jr.
|| 0 || 0 || 0 || 0 || 0 || 0 || 0 || 0 || 0
|-
|| 30 || MF ||align=left|  Yoskar Galvan-Mercado
|| 0 || 0 || 0 || 0 || 0 || 0 || 0 || 0 || 0
|-
|| 44 || FW ||align=left|   Alex Steinwascher
|| 0 || 0 || 0 || 0 || 0 || 0 || 0 || 0 || 0
|-
|| 95 || DF ||align=left|   Alexis Souahy
|| 0 || 0 || 0 || 0 || 0 || 0 || 0 || 0 || 0
|-
!colspan="3"|Total !! 0 !! 0 !! 0 !! 0 !! 0 !! 0 !! 0 !! 0 !! 0

Awards and honors

References

2023 USL League One season
American soccer clubs 2023 season
2023 in sports in Nebraska